The Belgium national under-18 football team are a feeder team for the main Belgium national football team.

The team plays an annual friendly tournament. In addition, it only plays practice matches. The team is mainly intended to prepare players from Belgium Under 17 for Belgium Under 19.

From 1948 to 2001, an annual European Under-18 Championship was played. In 1977, Belgium won the tournament. In 2002, the tournament was transformed into a European Under-19 football championship.

Recent results

Current squad
The following players have been called up for the friendly against Austria on 14 September 2016.

See also

References 

European national under-18 association football teams
Football